The Ta'anakh region (Hevel Ta'anakh), also known as Ta'anachim, is an area to the south of Israel's Jezreel Valley and east of the Wadi Ara region. The area is named after the biblical city (Joshua 17:11), located just across the Green Line in the northwest West Bank. In the 1950s, the area was settled by immigrants from Morocco, Tunisia, Kurdistan, and Poland.

Most or all of this region is located in the Gilboa Regional Council.

List of villages and community centers
Adirim
Avital
Barak
Dvora
Gadish
Meitav
Merkaz Hever
Merkaz Yael
Mlea
Nir Yafeh
Prazon
Ram-On

Six villages out of this list got names from the biblical story of Dvora's battle (Judges, chap 4-5): Adirim, Barak, Dvora, (Merkaz) Hever, Prazon and (Merkaz) Yael.

See also
Ti'inik

Regions of Israel
Gilboa Regional Council
Geography of Northern District (Israel)